Priekuļi is a village in Priekuļi Parish, Cēsis Municipality in the Vidzeme region of Latvia. It is situated 7 kilometres east of Cēsis and had 2,252 residents as of 2017.

References

Towns and villages in Latvia
Cēsis Municipality
Kreis Wenden
Vidzeme